Weightlifting at the 2017 Pacific Mini Games was held in Port Vila, Vanuatu at the Epauto Arena from 5–7 December.

Participating nations

Medal table

Event summary
Sixteen weightlifting categories were contested at the 2017 games.

Men's results

Women's results

See also
Weightlifting at the Pacific Games

References

2017 Pacific Mini Games
2017 in weightlifting
2017